Tomislav Živko (born 29 January 1988) is a Croatian retired footballer.

External links
 

1988 births
Living people
Sportspeople from Livno
Association football wingers
Croatian footballers
NK Vinogradar players
FC Rostov players
FK Ventspils players
NK Inter Zaprešić players
NK Zelina players
HŠK Zrinjski Mostar players
Russian First League players
Latvian Higher League players
Croatian Football League players
Premier League of Bosnia and Herzegovina players
Croatian expatriate footballers
Expatriate footballers in Russia
Croatian expatriate sportspeople in Russia
Expatriate footballers in Latvia
Croatian expatriate sportspeople in Latvia